Gare de Bayeux is the station for the town of Bayeux, Calvados, Normandy. It is situated on the Mantes-la-Jolie–Cherbourg railway.

It is a small station with regional trains (TER) to Cherbourg, Caen, Paris and Granville.

References

External links

 

Railway stations in Calvados
Railway stations in France opened in 1858
Bayeux